The XML Bookmark Exchange Language (XBEL), is an open XML standard for sharing Internet URIs, also known as bookmarks (or favorites in Internet Explorer).

An example of XBEL use is the XBELicious application, which stores Del.icio.us bookmarks in XBEL format. The Galeon, Konqueror, Arora and Midori web browsers use XBEL as the format for storing user bookmarks. The Floccus synchronization client can store XBEL on WebDAV servers. The SiteBar bookmark server can import and export bookmarks in XBEL format.

XBEL was created by the Python XML Special Interest Group "to create an interesting, fun project which was both useful and would demonstrate the Python XML processing software which was being developed at the time".

It is also used by Nautilus and gedit of the GNOME desktop environment.

See also 
 Internet bookmark
 XOXO (eXtensible Open XHTML Outlines), an XML microformat for outlines built on top of XHTML.
 OPML (Outline Processor Markup Language), an XML format for outlines.

References

External links 
 
 XBEL-Specs mailing list
 XBEL at SourceForge
 Python XML Special Interest Group

XML-based standards